The 2015 season for the  cycling team began in January at the Tour de San Luis. The team participated in UCI Continental Circuits and UCI World Tour events when given a wildcard invitation.

2015 roster

Riders who joined the team for the 2015 season

Season victories

Footnotes

References

External links
 

2015 road cycling season by team